Youssef Mohamed Abbas (2 December 1920 – 28 October 1956) was an Egyptian basketball player. He competed in the 1952 Summer Olympics.

References

1920 births
1956 deaths
Basketball players at the 1952 Summer Olympics
Egyptian men's basketball players
Olympic basketball players of Egypt
1950 FIBA World Championship players